Sereno Elmer Brett (October 31, 1891 – September 9, 1952) was a highly decorated brigadier general in the United States Army who fought in both World War I and World War II and played a key, if little recognized today, role in the development of armored warfare along with the creation of the U.S. Interstate Highway. He was also a lifelong friend of U.S. President, and former army colleague, Dwight D. Eisenhower.

Early life and military career
Brett was born on October 31, 1891, in Portland, Oregon, as a son of James Brett, and Clara Marie de Lille Harvey. Brett enrolled at Oregon State University and earned his Bachelor of Science at the Agricultural faculty in 1916. After his graduation, Brett entered the United States Army and, after attending a training course for officers, he was commissioned as a second lieutenant into the Infantry Branch of the Oregon National Guard, on November 28, 1916.

He first saw active service with the 3rd Infantry Regiment (The Old Guard) during the Pancho Villa Expedition.

During World War I, Brett was ordered to join the American Expeditionary Force (AEF), under the command of General John J. Pershing, on the Western Front in Belgium and France, to serve with the Tank Corps.

He was promoted to the rank of captain on July 25, 1917.

Commanding the 326th Tank Battalion, Brett, now a major, led the first major American tank attack of World War I at the Battle of Saint-Mihiel in September 1918 and, following Colonel George S. Patton's wounding, took command of the 1st Tank Brigade in his absence. Brett received the Distinguished Service Cross for his role in the battle. The Great War came to an end soon after, on November 11, 1918. In addition to the Distinguished Service Cross, his other decorations from the war were: Silver Star with Oak Leaf Cluster, Purple Heart with two Oak Leaf Clusters, French Croix de guerre 1914–1918 with palm and Officer of the Legion of Honour.

Distinguished Service Cross citation
His official Distinguished Service Cross citation reads:

General Orders: War Department, General Orders No. 15 (1919)
Action Date: September 12, 1918
Name: Sereno Elmer Brett
Service: Army
Rank: Major
Battalion: 326th Battalion (Light) Tanks
Division: Tank Corps, American Expeditionary Forces
Citation: The President of the United States of America, authorized by Act of Congress, July 9, 1918, takes pleasure in presenting the Distinguished Service Cross to Major (Armor) Sereno Elmer Brett, United States Army, for extraordinary heroism in action while serving with 326th Tank Battalion, Tank Corps, A.E.F., near Richecourt, France, 12 September 1918. On the opening day of the St. Mihiel offensive Major Brett led his battalion on foot from Richecourt to the Bois Quart De Reserve in the face of heavy machine-gun and artillery fire, and by his coolness and courage setting an example to the entire battalion.

Brett was also decorated with the Distinguished Service Medal for his service as chief instructor of Tank Center of the American Expeditionary Force.

Distinguished Service Medal citation
His official Distinguished Service Medal citation reads:

General Orders: War Department, General Orders No. 49 (1922)
Action Date: World War I
Name: Sereno Elmer Brett
Service: Army
Rank: Major
Company: Commanding Officer
Regiment: 1st Brigade
Division: Tank Corps, American Expeditionary Forces
Citation: The President of the United States of America, authorized by Act of Congress, July 9, 1918, takes pleasure in presenting the Army Distinguished Service Medal to Major (Armor) Sereno Elmer Brett, United States Army, for exceptionally meritorious and distinguished services to the Government of the United States, in a duty of great responsibility during World War I. As Chief Instructor at Tank Center, American Expeditionary Forces, Major Brett organized and trained the 327th Battalion (Light) Tanks. Later, as Commander of the 326th Battalion (Light) Tanks, he vigorously and skillfully led it in the St. Mihiel offensive over a terrain rendered most difficult through four years of enemy entrenching. Succeeding to the command of the 1st Brigade, Tank Corps, in the Meuse-Argonne offensive, he ably devotedly, and courageously commanded his brigade from 26 September to 10 November 1918; during this period of 46 days his brigade supported eight of the divisions of the First Army in 18 separate attacks. By his brilliant professional attainments, technical ability, and unusual leadership he contributed in a marked manner to the success of the First Army and rendered most conspicuous services to the American Expeditionary Forces in a position of great responsibility.

Life after the war

Following the war, he played a role alongside Patton and Dwight D. Eisenhower in evaluating the lessons learned from the war in the use of tanks in modern warfare. In 1919, Brett and future U.S. President Dwight D. Eisenhower toured the country's emerging paved highways with an Army caravan of 80-or-so military vehicles, Army's 1919 transcontinental motor convoy, to determine if the country could manage to move large amounts of troops and equipment quickly over long distances. Brett's work with Eisenhower on this mission laid the framework for the Interstate Highway Act of 1956.  

He commanded the Expeditionary Tank Force in 1923–1924 in Panama.

Brett remained in the U.S. Army through the lean interwar years, and was promoted to brigadier general in February 1942.

On June 3, 1941 he was designated the chief of staff of the Armored Force at Fort Knox, having previously served as chief of staff of the 1st Armored Division.

During World War II he served on the staff of the 5th Armored Division in 1942–1943 as it prepared for service in the European theatre, and was promoted to brigadier general in 1942, but retired from the army in October 1943 for medical reasons.

Brett died on September 9, 1952, in Santa Barbara, California. He and his wife, 2nd Lieutenant A.N.C. Elizabeth March Brett (1898–1981) are buried along with their son, Captain James Sereno Brett (1929-2020) at Arlington National Cemetery.

Brett donated his extensive collection of reports, diaries and memorandums, which include personal papers of General George S. Patton, to the University of North Dakota, Orin G. Libby Manuscript Collection. Among the important papers are personal diaries of Patton and Brett written during their deployment in France 1918, and reports of their tank operations at St. Mihiel and in the Meuse-Argonne.

Decorations

References

External links
Generals of World War II
United States Army Officers 1939−1945

1891 births
1952 deaths
United States Army Infantry Branch personnel
Military personnel from Oregon
United States Army personnel of World War I
Burials at Arlington National Cemetery
Military personnel from Portland, Oregon
Oregon State University alumni
Recipients of the Distinguished Service Cross (United States)
Recipients of the Distinguished Service Medal (US Army)
Recipients of the Silver Star
United States Army generals of World War II
United States Army generals